The Wilmington Wildcats, also referred to as the WilmU Wildcats, are the athletic teams that represent Wilmington University, located in New Castle, Delaware, in NCAA Division II intercollegiate sports. Most of the university's athletics facilities are at the Wilmington University Athletics Complex in Newark, rather than on its main campus in New Castle. 

The Wildcats are full members of the Central Atlantic Collegiate Conference, which is home to 16 of its 17 athletic programs. The women's bowling team competes in East Coast Conference. Wilmington has been a member of the CACC since 1999.

History

Wildcats mascot

The university's present mascot was unveiled in 2009. Following the announcement of the school's new mascot, the university involved students and faculty in a popular poll to suggest and choose a name for this new addition to Wilmington University's athletic presence. In late 2009, it was announced that the name "Wiley D. Wildcat," suggested by one of the students of Wilmington University, had won the poll and would become the mascot's official name. In addition to the mascot's presence at most NCAA Division II athletic events, the Wildcat mascot has become an instrumental part of the university's national-champion cheerleading team.

Varsity teams

List of teams

Men's sports (7)
 Baseball
 Basketball
 Cross Country
 Golf
 Lacrosse
 Soccer
 Track and field

Women's sports (10)
 Basketball
 Bowling
 Cheerleading
 Cross country
 Lacrosse
 Soccer
 Softball
 Tennis
 Track and field
 Volleyball

Individual teams

Baseball
The university's men's baseball team was named NCAA Division II East Regional champions in 2015 after a historic season.

Cheerleading
In addition to its NCAA Division II men's and women's athletic teams, Wilmington University is also home to a successful, co-ed cheerleading team. The university's cheerleading team was named the Universal Cheerleading Association's national champions for five consecutive years between 2012 and 2017.

Golf
Additionally, the men's golf team earned an NCAA Division II Atlantic/East Super Regional title in both 2012 and 2015.

References

External links
 

Wilmington University
College sports teams in Delaware
College sports teams in the United States by team
NCAA Division II teams
Sports in the Delaware Valley